La Hija de Dios is a municipality of Spain located in the province of Ávila, Castile and León. The municipality has a total area of 12.50 km2 and, as of 1 January 2021, a registered population of 80.

References

Municipalities in the Province of Ávila